Takers (formerly known as Bone Deep) is a 2010 American heist action thriller film directed by John Luessenhop from a story and screenplay written by Luessenhop, Gabriel Casseus, Peter Allen, and Avery Duff. It features Matt Dillon, Paul Walker, Idris Elba, Jay Hernandez, Michael Ealy, Tip "T.I." Harris, Chris Brown, Hayden Christensen and Zoe Saldana in an ensemble cast. The film was released on August 27, 2010.

The film follows a group of professional bank robbers (Ealy, Brown, Christensen, Walker and Elba) who specialize in spectacular robberies. They are pulled into one last job by a recently-paroled cohort (T.I.) only to be pitted against a hard-boiled detective (Dillon) and his partner (Hernandez) who interrupt their heist.

Plot

Detectives Jack Welles and Eddie Hatcher investigate a daring heist by a group of well-organized bank robbers. The crew, led by Gordon Cozier, consists of John, A.J., and brothers Jake and Jesse Attica. The crew is without a former member, Ghost, who was caught during a previous robbery five years before. In his absence, Jake began a relationship with Ghost's former girlfriend Lilly, who had accepted his marriage proposal.

After Ghost is released from prison, he meets up with the crew to plan a heist, in which it is discovered that two armored trucks will travel together, but that all the money is kept in the first truck, which holds $12 million.

The crew, dressed as construction workers, hide out underground, while Ghost poses as a police officer, so he can keep an eye out for the trucks. Meanwhile, in order to cover themselves in case Ghost is setting them up, John heads to the top of a nearby garage to take out Ghost with a sniper rifle in case things go wrong. The crew plan to detonate the blast when the armored trucks drive overhead, causing the trucks to fall underground. However, a cyclist causes the lead driver to stop short and the explosives are detonated too early. The lead driver radios the police, while armed guards pile out of the rear truck.

A gunfight ensues between the robbers in the crater and the guards on the street, until John commandeers the rear truck and rams the lead truck into the crater where the crew cut into it. John and the other robbers pack the cash into bags, and flee by heading down a variety of different tunnels, with the plan of connecting into various subway lines to make their escape.

Welles and Hatcher show up on the scene, and, after learning of the robbers' escape through the sewer system, remember a map of the city subway system from the Russian gang hideout, and deduce that they must be escaping through the stations marked on the map where the sewers intersect the subway. They rush to the nearest station, where they find Jesse, and a chase ensues, during which Jesse hides his bag of money and is cornered. He shoots Detective Hatcher and escapes while Welles stops to aid his partner, who dies from his wound.

Jesse reconvenes with the rest of the crew at a hotel room, and admits to the shooting of Hatcher. It is now revealed that Ghost had previously cut a deal with the Russian gangsters to kill his former accomplices in exchange for half of the heist's take. Ghost gives the Russians the hotel room number, then escapes out the bathroom window, just before the Russians storm the room and attempt to kill the crew. A.J. sacrifices himself to save the others in the ensuing gunfight, and the rest of the crew is able to kill the Russians and flee the building before the police arrive. Jake and Jesse return home where, to their horror, Jake finds Lilly's corpse, and Jesse finds the safe where they kept their secret stash of money opened and cleaned out. The police surround their bar, and shoot the two when they make a suicide charge outside, killing them.

Gordon and John separate to make their escape, but realize that Ghost intends to take all of their money, which is being held by Scott, a well-connected fence. Ghost sneaks onto Scott's private plane and kills him, taking their laundered money in two suitcases. Gordon and Detective Welles arrive, and a three-way Mexican standoff results in which Ghost hits both Gordon and Welles. As Ghost prepares to finish Gordon off, John arrives and shoots him dead. John recognizes Welles as the same cop, who was with the little girl. John and Gordon refuse to kill Welles. John and an injured Gordon take the money and drive off, with Gordon's sister Naomi in tow. A gravely wounded Welles manages to call 911 for help on his cell phone.

Cast
Matt Dillon as Jack Welles
Paul Walker as John Rahway
Idris Elba as Gordon Thomas "G" Cozier
Jay Hernandez as Eddie "Hatch" Hatcher
Michael Ealy as Jake Attica
Tip "T.I." Harris as Delonte "Ghost" Rivers
Chris Brown as Jesse Attica
Hayden Christensen as A.J.
Zoe Saldana as Lilly
Marianne Jean-Baptiste as Naomi Cozier
Glynn Turman as Chief Detective Duncan
Steve Harris as Lieutenant Carver
Johnathon Schaech as Scott
Gaius Charles as Max
Gideon Emery as Sergei
Zulay Henao as Monica Hatcher
Nick Turturro as Franco Dalia
Andrew Fiscella as Security Chief
Gino Anthony Pesi as Paulie, Jr.

Reception

Critical reception
Rotten Tomatoes, a review aggregator, reports that 28% of critics gave the film a positive review based on 115 reviews; the average rating is 4.6/10. The site's critics consensus reads, "Takers boasts some gripping set pieces and keeps things moving quickly, but its two-dimensional characters, clichéd script, and brazenly derivative plot make it hard to recommend." On Metacritic, the film holds a weighted average score of 45 out of 100 based on 20 critics, indicating "mixed or average reviews". Today called it "almost a good little heist movie", praising the plot twists but criticising the characterization.

Author Stephen King, in his end-of-the-year Entertainment Weekly column, listed it at #5 of his best films of 2010. He says that "the climax does strain credulity, but the characters feel real & the armored-car heist is the best action sequence in 2010"

Box office
The film was number one at the box office during its opening weekend, making $20,512,304. Takers made its U.S. debut on approximately 2,600 screens at 2,206 locations. According to Box Office Mojo, "The heist thriller tripled the start of Armored, and it came in only a bit behind last summer's higher-profile The Taking of Pelham 123. Its initial attendance was also nearly 50 percent greater than similar titles like Dead Presidents,  and Street Kings." Takers was made available on Blu-ray and DVD on January 18, 2011.

Accolades
BET Awards
 2011: Win – Best Actor – Idris Elba (also for Luther)
 2011: Nomination – Best Actor – Chris Brown
 2011: Nomination – Best Movie

Black Reel Awards
 2011: Nomination – Best Ensemble
 2011: Nomination – Best Screenplay, Adapted or Original

California on Location Awards
 2011: Win – Location Team of the Year – Features

NAACP Image Awards
 2011: Nomination – Outstanding Supporting Actor in a Motion Picture – Idris Elba

See also
List of black films of the 2010s

References

External links
 
 
 
 
 
 Behind-the-scenes photos from the Los Angeles Times
 Takers at Yahoo!

2010 films
2010 action thriller films
2010 crime action films
2010 crime thriller films
2010s heist films
American action thriller films
American crime action films
American crime thriller films
American heist films
Films set in Los Angeles
American police detective films
Films produced by Will Packer
Rainforest Films films
Films scored by Paul Haslinger
Films directed by John Luessenhop
2010s English-language films
2010s American films